The Nick Maughan Foundation, abbreviated as NMF, was established at the start of the pandemic in 2020 to further a range of philanthropic initiatives in education, the environment and civic support schemes for disenfranchised communities. 

Founded and funded by the British impact investor and philanthropist Nick Maughan, NMF has three clear priorities across its three core pillars of education, community and environment: (1) to narrow the educational attainment gap that has been gravely exacerbated by the pandemic and provide disadvantaged young people with opportunities through which to get back on their feet, (2) to combat the social problems of homelessness and knife crime in the UK, and (3) to mitigate the effects of climate change by supporting progressive conservation and carbon sequestration schemes around the globe.

NMF’s advisory board includes Lord St. John of Bletso, Edward King of the European Climate Foundation, Nomatemba Tambo (daughter of Oliver Tambo), Bim Afolami and Michael Farrant of Farrant Group.

Activities and initiatives

Education 
Committed to narrowing the educational attainment gap between wealthy and disadvantaged students, the Nick Maughan Foundation helps young people from families below the median-income level have the same opportunities as those from more fortunate backgrounds.

Recognising that the educational attainment gap has only widened during the pandemic, NMF’s Founder Nick Maughan explains in Conservative Home, ‘All young people have been dealt a bad hand by the indirect effects of the pandemic: school closures, disrupted social lives, stifled educations, scuppered paths to university, the looming prospect of insurmountable debt, and diminished prospects for gainful employment. However, some young people are more equal than others... as children from more disadvantaged backgrounds are more adversely affected by the direct and indirect effects of such measures.’

Seeking to close the educational gap, the Foundation works to identify suitable opportunities to award grants and scholarships to high-achieving children from families below the median-income level, as well as provide funding for under-resourced schools. NMF also funds academically gifted children from low-income families to attend elite private schools in London, including Putney High School

Community 
The Nick Maughan Foundation is dedicated to helping plug the gaps left by more than £500m worth of cuts to Britain’s national youth work budgets since 2011, which have left vulnerable young people without safe havens through which to develop their skills and talents outside the classroom. NMF targets its funding towards organisations and initiatives that promote opportunity among disadvantaged young people.

Explaining the challenges young people face today, Nick Maughan writes in City A.M., "It’s little wonder that the youth of today are unenthused about the promise of tomorrow, nor that their mental health is in a perilous state. The charity Samaritans has found a major spike in anxiety and depressive symptoms among this cohort. This once again will primarily be concentrated among the worst-off, who are more likely to have missed out on educational opportunities or had their fledgling careers damaged".

Seeking to combat the rise in mental health issues, as well as anti-social behaviour, NMF launched its flagship initiative BoxWise in 2020, founded by Nick Maughan and Rick Ogden. Offering a 10-week boxing programme delivered entirely by England Boxing coaches, BoxWise helps young people with their personal fitness and mental wellbeing while also offering progression routes to help its graduates enter further education or step into gainful employment. Many of BoxWise's students are referred by local police and social services, with which BoxWise works closely to maximise the social benefit of its impact. Other students are referred to BoxWise from a range of youth services, including the UK's leading youth homeless charity Centrepoint of which Prince William, The Prince of Wales is the Royal Patron.

BoxWise is currently active in 42 locations across the UK, with two of its centres offering adaptive boxing classes to enable disabled young people to participate in the programme. Its sites include five across London, as well as venues in Glasgow, Sheffield, Manchester, East Middlesbrough, Telford, Birmingham, and Wales. Thousands of young people have already graduated from its 10-week programme, however, as BoxWise quickly expands across the country, the organisation hopes to double the number of young people it currently reaches.

In 2022, BoxWise went international, opening venues in South Africa, Uganda, and Ireland with programmes launched in Brazil and Tanzania launching in 2023. Amongst the programmes offered are a course in Eastleigh Boxing Club dedicated to helping Ukrainian refugees adjust to life in the U.K., and a number of female only courses aiming to encourage young women to pick up the sport.

BoxWise’s Advisory Board includes Mishcon de Reya’s Head of Mishcon Purpose Alexander Rhodes and Lord St. John of Bletso. Boxwise is also represented by celebrity ambassadors that include professional boxers Hannah Rankin, Lawrence Okolie, Anthony Crolla, and Joshua Buatsi, as well as entrepreneur Ayo Gordon. The charity is also actively engaged in researching the role that sports can play in the furtherance of civil society through youth crime reduction. In partnership with Iain Duncan Smith's think-tank, The Centre for Social Justice, the Nick Maughan Foundation leads a substantial national research project.

As an example of its work with communities internationally, the Nick Maughan Foundation is also actively involved in developing and funding social infrastructure projects in Africa.

The Nick Maughan Maternity Centre is a new purpose-built medical facility specialising in childbirth, infant and women’s health with the capacity to safely deliver more than 3,000 babies every year. The Centre strives to dramatically reduce the rates of neo-natal and maternal deaths in Uganda – currently one of the highest in the world. Along with the NMF Medical Centre, these facilities ease the high pressure for healthcare services, improving the quality of life of local residents.

The foundation is also funding the construction of a large new secondary school developed with operating partners Spotlight On Africa. The NMF Riverside School will have capacity for over 1,250 children in the Namatala region, hugely increasing the number of primary school students that proceed to secondary education.

The school includes a state-of-the-art IT centre that will teach valuable technology skills, dormitories for children who need to board and first-class sports facilities. 

NMF’s other community philanthropy initiatives include supporting the Glasgow based Charlie Miller Football Academy, founded by the former Premier League footballer. NMF is also a major donor to the youth support charity Berkshire Youth Trust, through which the Foundation has contributed to the Trust’s reconstruction of the Waterside Centre in Newbury. The centre is set to offer a range of activities from sport to music, as well as counselling services and vocational training to help young people make successful transitions to adulthood. 

NMF donated £10,000 to the Alder Hey Children’s Hospital following a campaign led by professional boxer Tyson Fury.

Environment 
The Foundation is also committed to reversing the climatic effects brought on by the accelerated pace of fossil fuel use for power, industry and transport. By donating to organisations effective in carbon reduction, sequestration and wildlife conservation, NMF works to build a safer planet for future generations.

NMF donated over £1m to support Tusk Trust, an anti-poaching charity of which The Prince of Wales, is the Royal Patron. NMF’s support helps Tusk further its mission to combat poaching, habitat loss, and human-wildlife conflict.

Specific initiatives NMF has supported include the Tusk Lion Trail – an international street art exhibition aiming to raise awareness of the magnificence of lions and the threats facing them today. Sponsoring life-sized lion sculptures designed by the likes of actor John Clease and Rolling Stones star Ronnie Wood, the global art installation raised £1.1m for conservation projects.

NMF also sponsors Tusk’s annual Conservation Awards, including the Tusk Wildlife Ranger Award, which seeks to recognise an individual dedicated to protecting Africa’s wildlife. Previous winners include Amos Gwema from Zimbabwe, a wildlife intelligence officer that works with local communities to dismantle poaching networks, and Suleiman Saidu, a park ranger that works to protect elephants in Yankari National Park in Nigeria.  Recognising the unsung conservation heroes of today, the award hopes to inspire the environmental leaders of tomorrow.

NMF has also matched all donations up to £150,000 made to Tusk through The Times newspaper’s 2020 Annual Christmas Appeal, with the additional funding going towards protecting endangered animals and the livelihoods of thousands of local farmers.

References

External links 

 Nick Maughan Foundation

Charities based in the United Kingdom
2010 in England
Wildlife conservation organizations